Hubert Glacier is located on the south side of Mount Olympus in the Olympic Mountains and Olympic National Park. Due to its southern orientation, the glacier is smaller than those on the north side of Mount Olympus, such as Blue Glacier.

Named for Anna Hubert, the only female member of the first ascent of Mount Olympus, the Hubert Glacier occupies a cirque at the bottom of the headwall, with one branch extending to the south up the mountainside.

See also
List of glaciers in the United States

References

Glaciers of the Olympic Mountains
Glaciers of Jefferson County, Washington
Glaciers of Washington (state)